Surya Prasad Upadhyaya (14 September 1907 – 30 July 1984) was a Nepalese politician. Upadhyaya was a leader of the Nepal Democratic Congress, which merged with into the Nepali Congress in 1950.

He was born in Kathmandu on 14 September 1907.

Upadhyaya became Home and Law Minister in the Nepali Congress cabinet after the 1959 election. He led the Nepalese delegation at the 1959 UN General Assembly. During the December 1960 royal coup d'état, he was arrested along with B.P. Koirala and Ganesh Man Singh.

In 1978 he took part in a split in the Nepali Congress, and he and Bakhan Singh Gurung founded the Nepali Congress (Subarna).

He died in New Delhi on 30 July 1984.

References

Government ministers of Nepal
Nepali Congress politicians from Bagmati Province
Nepali Congress (Subarna) politicians
Permanent Representatives of Nepal to the United Nations
1907 births
1984 deaths
Members of the National Assembly (Nepal)